The International Racquetball Federation's 21st Racquetball World Championships were held in San Luis Potosi, Mexico from August 20-27, 2022. This was the first time Worlds was in Mexico since 2000, when it was also held in San Luis Potosi.

The 2022 World Championships used a best of five games match format with each game to 11 points, win by 2, with rally scoring, as used in other sports like squash and volleyball. Previously, racquetball games used side-out scoring, where players scored points only when they had won a rally which began with that player serving. Rallies won when not serving were simply side-outs: the rally losing player lost the serve and the rally winning player won the opportunity to serve, but did not win a point.

In 2022, Mexicans Paola Longoria and Samantha Salas won Women's Doubles for a record extending 5th time, but they needed five games and extra points in the fifth game to defeat the Argentina team of Valeria Centellas and Natalia Mendez in the final, winning 11-6, 15-17, 11-9, 9-11, 12-10.

Tournament format
The 2022 World Championships used a two-stage format to determine the World Champions. Initially, players competed in separate groups over three days. The results were used to seed teams for the medal round.

Women’s doubles

Preliminary round
Group 1

Group 2

Group 3

Medal round

References

External links
IRF website

Racquetball World Championships
Racquetball in Mexico
Racquetball competitions